Kambar may refer to:

Kambar (given name), a Kazakh male name
Kambar (poet), a prominent Tamil language poet, writer and playwright, popularly known for authoring Ramavatharam
Kambar Taluka, a tehsil in Shahdadkot, Sindh, Pakistan

See also
 Qambar (person), a freed slave of the Islamic caliph Ali
 Chandrashekhara Kambara